Lampasas County is a county located on the Edwards Plateau in the U.S. state of Texas. As of the 2020 census, its population was 21,627. Its county seat is Lampasas. The county is named for the Lampasas River.

Lampasas County is part of the Killeen–Temple metropolitan statistical area.

History

Indigenous peoples were the first inhabitants of the area. Later known tribes in the area included Tonkawa, Lipan Apache and Comanche.
1721 The Aguayo expedition is said to have passed through the county.
1756 A presidio is established by Don Pedro de Terreros with the assistance of elements of the Spanish Army, at the confluence of Lucy Creek and Arroya Cavalto.  The effort was abandoned not long after, but the site remained as a base of operations by Thomas Isaac Cox, a member of Terreros' original expedition, for the purpose of obtaining hundreds of Texas mustangs for use by the Continental Army during the American Revolutionary War.
1853 Moses Hughes and his invalid wife, Hannah (Berry), became the first permanent settlers, seeking to take advantage of the medicinal springs.
1854 John Patterson was the first man to cultivate land in the county.
1855 Elizabeth and George W. Scott laid out the town of Burleson, named for her father. The town was later renamed Lampasas, when it becomes the county seat.
1856 The Sixth Texas Legislature formed Lampasas County, named after the Lampasas River, from parts of Travis, Bell, and Coryell Counties. Burleson, renamed Lampasas, is made the county seat.
1858 The northeastern corner of Lampasas County became part of Hamilton County.
1859 The Lampasas Guards were organized to ward off Indian attacks.
1860 Lampasas County's population was 1,028.  About 15 percent were slaves.
1861 Indian raids increased in Lampasas, as able-bodied men were off fighting in the war.
1872 Townsen's Mill was built by Perry and Jasper Townsen. This steam mill cut "rawhide" lumber and ground wheat and corn.
1874 Henry A. Chadwick and son Milam built a sawmill, flour mill and cotton gin.
1875 The Farmers' Alliance was born in Lampasas in reaction against the cattle rustling and illegal land dealings prevalent in the county.
1877 Gunfight at the Lampasas Saloon
1882 The Gulf, Colorado and Santa Fe Railway extended its line west from Belton to Lampasas.
1885 The Texas Bankers Association, the oldest and largest in the United States, had its beginnings in Lampasas.
1887 Mills County received northern and northwestern sections of Lampasas County.
1892, April 20 – First state meeting of the Daughters of the Republic of Texas was held in Lampasas.
1902 Pierian Club of Lampasas, a civic women's organization, was chartered.
1920s Texas Power and Light Company arrived in Lampasas County.
1934 The Lower Colorado River Authority brought electricity to the county.
1935 Rollins-Brook Hospital opened near Lampasas.
1942 Fort Hood opened as a military training base. Hancock Park in Lampasas was temporarily turned over to the troops as a recreational area.
1949 Lone Star Gas established services in the county.
Lampasas Mother's Day Flood

Geography

Major highways
 U.S. Highway 183
 U.S. Highway 190
 U.S. Highway 281

Adjacent counties
Hamilton County (north)
Coryell County (northeast)
Bell County (southeast)
Burnet County (south)
San Saba County (west)
Mills County (northwest)

Demographics

Note: the US Census treats Hispanic/Latino as an ethnic category. This table excludes Latinos from the racial categories and assigns them to a separate category. Hispanics/Latinos can be of any race.

As of the census of 2000, 17,762 people, 6,554 households, and 4,876 families were residing in the county.  The population density was 25 people/sq mi (10/km2).  The 7,601 housing units averaged 11/sq mi (4/km2).  The racial makeup of the county was 86.75% White, 3.10% African American, 0.70% Native American, 0.75% Asian, 6.55% from other races, and 2.15% from two or more races.  About 15.07% of the population was Hispanic or Latino of any race.

Of the 6,554 households, 35.10% had children under 18 living with them, 60.70% were married couples living together, 9.50% had a female householder with no husband present, and 25.60% were not families. About 21.90% of all households were made up of individuals, and 10.50% had someone living alone who was 65 years of age or older.  The average household size was 2.66, and the average family size was 3.08.

In the county, age distribution was 27.60% under  18, 7.70% from 18 to 24, 27.20% from 25 to 44, 23.00% from 45 to 64, and 14.50% who were 65  or older.  The median age was 37 years. For every 100 females, there were 96.30 males.  For every 100 females age 18 and over, there were 93.30 males.

The median income for a household in the county was $36,176, and for a family was $41,395. Males had a median income of $30,320 versus $20,637 for females. The per capita income for the county was $17,184.  About 10.70% of families and 14.10% of the population were below the poverty line, including 18.70% of those under  18 and 14.80% of those 65 or over.

Communities

Cities
Copperas Cove (mostly in Coryell County and a small part in Bell County)
Kempner
Lampasas (county seat)
Lometa

Unincorporated communities
 Adamsville
 Bend (partly in San Saba County)
 Izoro
 Moline (partly in Mills County)
 Nix
 Rumley

Ghost town
Senterfitt

Politics

See also

List of museums in Central Texas
National Register of Historic Places listings in Lampasas County, Texas
Recorded Texas Historic Landmarks in Lampasas County

References

External links
 

 
1856 establishments in Texas
Populated places established in 1856
Killeen–Temple–Fort Hood metropolitan area
Texas Hill Country